Up All Night is a 2003 album by jazz guitarist John Scofield, his sixth album for the Verve label, and the second for “The John Scofield Band”. For this recording, the band included second guitarist and co-producer Avi Bortnick and drummer Adam Deitch, both of whom appeared on Überjam. The recording also features bass guitarist Andy Hess (who also played in Gov’t Mule). A four piece horn section, arranged by Scofield, appears on six of the eleven tracks. The Dramatics’ 1971 hit "Whatcha See Is Whatcha Get” is the only cover. Five of the tracks were co-written by Scofield and the band.

Critical reception
On AllAboutJazz Farrell Lowe begins his review “The Freaky Deaky is back!,” referring to Scofield's time playing with Miles Davis, “this is the most inspired playing I have heard from John Scofield in many years.”
“Scofield inhabits a place in which the cerebral and the funky ... form an alliance and work together for the common good,” Alex Henderson writes in his four-star-review on AllMusic, and concludes: “Up All Night is a consistently engaging addition to his sizable catalog.”
Whereas on JazzTimes Nate Chinen writes in his critique, “Scofield and crew acquit themselves flawlessly to the material, but ... there are no real clunkers on the album (despite a cheeky "Watch Out for Po-Po," which comes close). ... What seems to be missing is the edgy sensibility of a band reaching beyond its limits. It should serve as a testament to Scofield that those borders have already been stretched to the extreme.”

Track listing
All tracks arranged by John Scofield.
"Philiopiety" (John Scofield, Avi Bortnick, Adam Deitch, Yusef Lateef) – 6:23
"Watch Out for Po-Po" (Scofield, Bortnick, Deitch, Jesse Murphy) – 6:04
"Creeper" (Scofield) – 7:27
"Whatcha See Is Whatcha Get" (Tony Hester) – 5:53
"I'm Listening" (Scofield, Bortnick, Deitch, Murphy) – 2:58
"Thikhathali" (Scofield, Bortnick, Deitch, Murphy) – 6:58
"Four on the Floor" (Scofield) – 6:03
"Like the Moon" (Scofield) – 6:40
"Freakin' Disco" (Scofield, Bortnick, Deitch) – 8:21
"Born in Troubled Times" (Scofield) – 4:56
"Every Night Is Ladies Night" (Scofield) – 5:27

Personnel
John Scofield – electric guitar, guitar samples
Avi Bortnick – rhythm guitar, samples, loops
Andy Hess – electric bass guitar
Adam Deitch – drums
Horn section on tracks 1, 4, 6–8, 11, arranged by John Scofield
Craig Handy – tenor saxophone, flute, bass clarinet
Gary Smulyan – baritone saxophone
Earl Gardner – trumpet
Jim Pugh – trombone
Samson Olawale – percussion on track 6

References

2003 albums
Jazz fusion albums by American artists
Verve Records albums
John Scofield albums